Jerry Gant (November 21, 1961 – November 11, 2018) was an American visual artist, poet, performance artist and educator.

Early life and education 

Gant was born in Newark, New Jersey. He grew up moving around Newark with his mother. When he was young, he lost his father to alcohol, cirrhosis, and according to Gant, "It was poverty beating him into submission. He didn't die; he was killed."

Gant attended West Side High School and studied at Essex County College and the Newark School of Fine and Industrial Arts.

Career 

Gant was active in the 1980s graffiti scene in New York City. Influenced by African-American artists such as filmmaker Spike Lee, in the early 1990s, Gant started performing spoken word in New York City and Newark. Gant creates artistic works textile and clothing design, metal sculpture, woodcarving, and wall murals. Gant sought to reflect the spirit and community of Newark, while challenging stereotypes and conventional thinking. He worked on art projects inside and often outside the "white-cube" in an effort to expand the role art can play in urban spaces. Gant has worked on murals across every ward in Newark. He was also commissioned to create a number of public sculptures. Thirteen of Gant's sculptures are installed in Nat Turner Park.

Art critic Benjamin Genocchio of The New York Times described Gant's sculptures that use found wood, metal and wire in his series of "ghetto blasters" as referencing "urbanity and the raw, explosive energy of music."

Gant's murals can be seen in New York City, Boston, London, and Newark.

Selected exhibitions 
2015 - I Might Be Next: Jerry Gant & Bryant Lebron, Paul Robeson Galleries, Rutgers University, Newark, NJ
2007 - My Brother's Thread, Cork Gallery, NY
2006 - ... but I was cool, Aljira, a Center for Contemporary Art, Newark, NJ
2005 - William Turner Sculpture Garden, Maplewood, NJ
2005 - Top Dog Underdog, Luna Stage Artist Space, Montclair, NJ

Honors 
2006 - Artist in Residence Program, Gallery Aferro
2006 - Artstart Grant, Newark Arts Council
2005 - Creative Heartwork Residency Awardship
2010- Newark Museum Film Festival, Paul Robeson Award, Honorable mention Short Documentary; "BulletProof Ambition"

References 

1961 births
2018 deaths
Artists from Newark, New Jersey
American muralists
American male poets
20th-century American sculptors
Essex County College alumni
Culture of Newark, New Jersey
West Side High School (New Jersey) alumni
21st-century American sculptors